Glaucopsyche lygdamus, the silvery blue, is a small butterfly native to North America. Its upperside is a light blue in males and a dull grayish blue in females. The underside is gray with a single row of round spots of differing sizes depending upon the region.

G. lygdamus is found over much of the western United States and most of Canada extending north excepting most of Nunavut and the high Arctic islands. Wingspan is from 18 to 28 mm. It occurs in a variety of habitats including alpine meadows, shale barrens, dunes, and wooded areas. It feeds on Lupinus plants.

Subspecies 

Listed alphabetically:

 G. l. afra (W. H. Edwards, 1884) – Afra (silvery) blue
 G. l. arizonensis McDunnough, 1934 – Arizona silvery blue
 G. l. australis (F. Grinnell, 1917) – southern (silvery) blue
 G. l. columbia (Skinner, 1917) – Columbia blue or Skinner's (silvery) blue
 G. l. couperi Grote, 1873 – Couper's silvery blue
 G. l. deserticola (Austin & J. Emmel, 1998) – Mojave silvery blue
 G. l. incognitus Tilden, 1974 – Behr's silvery blue
 G. l. jacki Stallings & Turner, 1947 – Jack's (silvery) blue
 G. l. lygdamus (Edward Doubleday, 1841) – (Georgian) silvery blue
 G. l. mildredae F. Chermock, 1944 – Mildred's silvery blue
 G. l. minipunctum (Austin, 1998) – mini-spotted silvery blue
 G. l. nittanyensis (F. Chermock, 1944) – Appalachian silvery blue
 G. l. oro Scudder, 1876 – oro (silvery) blue
 G. l. palosverdesensis (E. Perkins & J. Emmel, 1977) – Palos Verdes blue
 G. l. pseudoxerces (Emmel & Emmel, 1998) – false Xerces (silvery) blue
 G. l. sabulosa (Emmel, Emmel & Mattoon, 1998) – sand dune silvery blue

Visually similar species 
 Eastern tailed-blue (Cupido comyntas) has small 'tails' on hindwings
 Western tailed-blue (Cupido amyntula) has small 'tails' on hindwings
 Arrowhead blue (Glaucopsyche piasus)
 Greenish blue (Aricia saepiolus) has two rows of small black spots on the underside of both wings
 Boisduval's blue (Aricia icarioides) has two rows of small black spots on the underside of both wings

References

External links 
 
 Silvery blue, Talk about Wildlife
 Silvery blue, Massachusetts Butterfly Club

lygdamus
Butterflies described in 1841
Butterflies of North America